Kevin Cannavò (born 9 February 2000) is an Italian footbalerl who plays as a forward for  club Padova on loan from Vis Pesaro.

Career
He is a product of youth teams of Palermo. He signed his first professional contract with the club on 4 October 2018 for a term of 4 years.

He made his Serie B debut for Palermo on 26 January 2019 in a game against Cremonese, as a 75th-minute substitute for Ivaylo Chochev.

Empoli
On 18 July 2019, Cannavò signed to Serie B club Empoli for free. He mostly played for their Under-19 squad in the 2019–20 season, he was called up to the senior squad 10 times but remained on the bench on all those occasions.

Vis Pesaro
On 21 August 2020, he joined Vis Pesaro on loan. On 5 July 2021, he moved to Vis Pesaro on a permanent basis and signed a three-year contract.

On 24 January 2023, Cannavò was loaned by Padova.

References

External links
 

2000 births
Living people
People from Partinico
Footballers from Sicily
Sportspeople from the Province of Palermo
Italian footballers
Association football forwards
Serie B players
Serie C players
Palermo F.C. players
Empoli F.C. players
Vis Pesaro dal 1898 players
Calcio Padova players